Lucina's shrew (Crocidura lucina) is a species of mammal in the family Soricidae. It is endemic to Ethiopia. The mammal's natural habitats are subtropical or tropical grassland and swamps from  elevation.

References

Lucina's shrew
Endemic fauna of Ethiopia
Mammals of Ethiopia
Fauna of the Ethiopian Highlands
Ethiopian montane moorlands
Vulnerable animals
Vulnerable biota of Africa
Lucina's shrew
Taxonomy articles created by Polbot